Luzonotrechus is a genus of beetles in the family Carabidae, containing the following species:

 Luzonotrechus bontoc (Darlington, 1959)
 Luzonotrechus muscicola Ueno, 1988
 Luzonotrechus rotundicollis Ueno, 1988
 Luzonotrechus teras Ueno, 1988
 Luzonotrechus tumidulus Ueno, 1979
 Luzonotrechus unipunctatus Ueno, 1979

References

Trechinae